Philippe Billy (born 13 January 1982) is a French former professional footballer who played as a defender.

Club career
Billy was born in Nantes. He played extensively at French football clubs after making his professional debut in 2000, for clubs including Bastia in Ligue 1 and Laval and Brest in Ligue 2.

He also played several seasons for Lecce in the Italian Serie A between 2001 and 2006, and one season with Mons in the Belgian Jupiler League in 2004–05.

On 27 January 2010, he signed with the Montreal Impact of USSF Division 2. He was released by Montreal on 12 October 2011.

One year later, in November 2012, he signs with USJA Carquefou in the French third division.

International career
Billy made five appearances for the French U-21 team during his youth, but has never been called up to the senior national side.

He also played for the non-FIFA affiliated Brittany national football team in a friendly game against Congo in 2008.

References

External links
 
 
 Profile

1982 births
Living people
Footballers from Nantes
Association football defenders
French footballers
France under-21 international footballers
Stade Lavallois players
U.S. Lecce players
SC Bastia players
R.A.E.C. Mons players
Stade Brestois 29 players
Montreal Impact (1992–2011) players
USJA Carquefou players
US Changé players
Ligue 1 players
Ligue 2 players
Serie A players
Serie B players
Belgian Pro League players
USSF Division 2 Professional League players
North American Soccer League players
French expatriate footballers
Expatriate footballers in Italy
Expatriate footballers in Belgium
Expatriate soccer players in Canada
Brittany international footballers